Islah or Al-Islah is an Arabic word usually translated as "reform", in the sense of "to improve, to better, to correct something and removing vice or to put something into a better position."

Islah may also refer to:

People
Islah Jad (born 1951), Palestinian professor and academician in Birzeit University
Islah Abdur Rahman (born 1991), English film director and actor

Places
Islah, Qalqilya, village in the Palestinian West Bank
Al-Islah Mosque, Muslim mosque in Michigan
Madrasatul Islah, an Islamic institution of learning in India
Masjid Al Islah, Singapore, a mosque

Politics
Al-Islah (Yemen), or the Yemeni Congregation for Reform, a political party in Yemen
Al Islah (United Arab Emirates), Islamist group based in the United Arab Emirates that is affiliated with the Muslim Brotherhood
Islah Party, or Hizb Al-Islah, also known as Egyptian Reform Party, a Salafi political party in Egypt
El-Islah, also known as Movement for National Reform, moderate Islamist political party in Algeria
El Islah, political party in Mauritania
Hizb el Islah al Suri, also known as Reform Party of Syria, Syrian lobby group based in the United States that was active in the mid to late 2000s
Hizb Al-Islah wa Al-Tanmiyah, also known as Reform and Development Misruna Party, an Egyptian liberal political party
National Reform Trend, Iraqi political party

Sports
Al Islah Al Bourj Al Shimaly, football and sports club in Lebanon

Music
Islah (album), debut studio album by American rapper Kevin Gates.

Media
Al-Islah (newspaper), a weekly newspaper of the Khaksar movement

Organizations
Jamaah Islah Malaysia, Malaysian NGO